John Trevenant (alternatively Trefnant or Tresnant; in some sources named Thomas Trevenant; died 29 March 1404) was a medieval Bishop of Hereford of Welsh descent. He was nominated on 5 May 1389 and consecrated on 20 June 1389.

Trevenant was from the village Trefnant in North Wales. According to R. G. Davies in the Oxford Dictionary of National Biography, Richard II of England "told the pope that Trefnant was related 'in a close degree' to certain nobles 'assisting at our side, presumed to refer to the Lords Appellant and specifically the earls of Arundel.

In the deposition of Richard II, Trevenant and Richard Scrope played a central part.

Citations

References

 
 
 The Visitation of Hereford Diocese in 1397, edited by Ian Forrest and Christopher Whittick (Boydell Press, 2021).

Bishops of Hereford
14th-century births
14th-century Italian Roman Catholic bishops
15th-century Italian Roman Catholic bishops
1404 deaths